The 2011–12 Suzuki Swift Sport Cup season was the fifth Suzuki Swift Sport Cup season. The season began at Pukekohe on 4 November 2011 and finished at the Taupo on 11 March 2012 after six rounds.

Calendar

Teams and drivers

Championship results

References

External links
 

Suzuki
Suzuki
Suzuki Swift Sport Cup